Loogootee is an unincorporated community in Fayette County, Illinois, United States. Loogootee had a post office, which closed on June 17, 2011.

References

Unincorporated communities in Fayette County, Illinois
Unincorporated communities in Illinois